Powerlifting at the 1984 Summer Paralympics consisted of seven events for men.

Medal summary

References 

 

 
1984 Summer Paralympics events
Paralympics